Neat may refer to: 

 Neat (bartending), a single, unmixed liquor served in a rocks glass
 Neat, an old term for horned oxen
 Neat Records, a British record label
 Neuroevolution of augmenting topologies (NEAT), a genetic algorithm (GA) for the generation of evolving artificial neural networks

See also
 Neet (disambiguation)
 NEAT (disambiguation)
 "Neat Neat Neat"
 Neate, a surname
 Neat Volume